Black Eye  is a 1974  American neo-noir action and blaxploitation film produced by Pat Rooney, directed by Jack Arnold and starring Fred Williamson. The film was based on the 1971 novel Murder on the Wild Side by Jeff Jacks.

Plot
A Los Angeles private investigator is called to investigate multiple murders that are connected to a cane that was stolen from a deceased silent movie star.

Cast
 Fred Williamson as Stone
 Rosemary Forsyth as Miss Francis
 Teresa Graves as Cynthia
 Richard Anderson as Dole
 Richard X. Slattery as Bowen
 Larry Mann as Avery
 Frank Ashmore as Chess
 Theodore Wilson as Lindy
 Belinda Balaski as Mary
 Joanne Bruno as Moms
 Nick Ramus

Reception 
In a contemporary review for the Los Angeles Times, critic Kevin Thomas called the film a "modest, entertaining private detective caper" and wrote: "If 'Black Eye' ... lacks both originality and individuality it is nonetheless serviceable, mainly credible and not unduly violent." Thomas also praised Williamson, who  "continues to impress in one of his best opportunities to date."

See also
 List of American films of 1974

References

External links
 
 Black Eye . Monthly Film Bulletin. FLAF International Index to Film Periodicals Database. Retrieved 2019-04-13
 https://nostalgiacentral.com/movies/movies-by-decade/movies-1970s/black-eye-1974/

1974 films
Warner Bros. films
1970s crime action films
American crime action films
African-American films
1970s English-language films
1970s American films